Marie Kofoed, née Bohn (19 January 1760 - 20 April 1838), was a Danish businessperson, landowner and philanthropist. She was a local patriot and played an important part in the history of Bornholm.

Life
She was born to the businessman Morten Bohn (1719-1802) and Barbara Kirstine Ancher (1725-1771) in Rønne. She married businessman Jochum Herman Ancher (1746-1786) in 1776, and the merchant and landowner Hans Peter Kofoed (1743-1812) in 1786. She belonged to the Bornholm elite by birth and both her marriages.

Career
After the death of her second spouse, she managed his affairs and estate and became a major landowner and business person. She both inherited a fortune and expanded it, and she used spent a great part of her money charity. She financed public institutions such as churches, schools and hospitals on Bornholm and Sjælland, and supported a number of individuals, notably Johan Nicolai Madvig, whose education she paid for, and particularly took an interest in the welfare of sailors and their families in Copenhagen.

Legacy
In her will, she bequeathed large sums to the benefit of sailors and their widows on Bornholm; the widows of officials in Copenhagen; and poor unmarried women. She was known for her social projects, and was in 1818 awarded with the title of etatsrådinde, a title normally only held by women married to men with the male equivalent and not otherwise granted to women for their own merit.

References
 Dansk Kvindebiografisk Leksikon
 Dansk Biografisk Leksikon

1760 births
1838 deaths
19th-century Danish businesswomen
19th-century Danish women landowners
19th-century Danish landowners
Danish philanthropists
Danish women philanthropists
Bornholm
19th-century philanthropists